Rutanen is a Finnish surname. Notable people with the surname include:

Aleksi Rutanen (born 1994), Finnish ice hockey player
Pasi Rutanen (born 1936), Finnish journalist and diplomat

See also
Rautanen

Finnish-language surnames